Andrzej Lubieniecki (1521–1623) was a Polish historian and priest, member of the Polish Brethren.

His major work was the Poloneutichia albo Polskiego Królestwa Szczęście.

1521 births
1623 deaths
16th-century Polish historians
Polish male non-fiction writers
Polish Unitarians
17th-century Polish historians